Powell County is a county in the U.S. state of Montana. As of the 2020 census, the population was 6,946. Its county seat is Deer Lodge.

Geography

Major highways

  Interstate 90
  U.S. Route 10 (Former)
  U.S. Route 12
  Montana Highway 141
  Montana Highway 200

Adjacent counties

 Flathead County - north
 Lewis and Clark County - east
 Jefferson County - southeast
 Deer Lodge County - south
 Granite County - southwest
 Missoula County - west

National protected areas

 Beaverhead-Deerlodge National Forest (part)
 Flathead National Forest (part)
 Grant-Kohrs Ranch National Historic Site
 Helena National Forest (part)
 Lolo National Forest (part)
 Bob Marshall Wilderness Area (part)
 Scapegoat Wilderness Area (part)

Demographics

2000 census
As of the 2000 United States census, there were 7,180 people, 2,422 households, and 1,634 families in the county. The population density was 3 people per square mile (1/km2). There were 2,930 housing units at an average density of 1 per square mile (0/km2). The racial makeup of the county was 92.52% White, 0.50% Black or African American, 3.51% Native American, 0.43% Asian, 0.74% from other races, and 2.30% from two or more races. 1.95% of the population were Hispanic or Latino of any race. 25.0% were of German, 13.6% Irish, 9.7% English, 7.4% American and 5.8% Norwegian ancestry.

There were 2,422 households, out of which 29.50% had children under the age of 18 living with them, 55.50% were married couples living together, 7.70% had a female householder with no husband present, and 32.50% were non-families. 28.60% of all households were made up of individuals, and 13.30% had someone living alone who was 65 years of age or older. The average household size was 2.39 and the average family size was 2.93.

The county population contained 21.20% under the age of 18, 7.80% from 18 to 24, 30.80% from 25 to 44, 26.20% from 45 to 64, and 14.00% who were 65 years of age or older. The median age was 40 years. For every 100 females there were 143.20 males. For every 100 females age 18 and over, there were 151.40 males.

The median income for a household in the county was $30,625, and the median income for a family was $35,836. Males had a median income of $26,366 versus $20,457 for females. The per capita income for the county was $13,816. About 10.20% of families and 12.60% of the population were below the poverty line, including 16.20% of those under age 18 and 6.00% of those age 65 or over.

2010 census
As of the 2010 United States census, there were 7,027 people, 2,466 households, and 1,582 families in the county. The racial makeup of the county was 92.4% white, 4.4% American Indian, 1.0% black or African American, 0.5% Asian, 0.4% from other races, and 1.3% from two or more races. Those of Hispanic or Latino origin made up 1.7% of the population. In terms of ancestry, 27.9% were German, 19.1% were Irish, 14.6% were English, 8.5% were Norwegian, and 4.7% were American.

Of the 2,466 households, 26.5% had children under the age of 18 living with them, 50.8% were married couples living together, 8.8% had a female householder with no husband present, 35.8% were non-families, and 32.2% of all households were made up of individuals. The average household size was 2.23 and the average family size was 2.79. The median age was 45.1 years.

The median income for a household in the county was $39,851 and the median income for a family was $45,339. Males had a median income of $30,163 versus $24,837 for females. The per capita income for the county was $17,849. About 12.3% of families and 17.3% of the population were below the poverty line, including 32.4% of those under age 18 and 13.0% of those age 65 or over.

Government and infrastructure
The current Montana State Prison facility is located in an unincorporated area in the county, near Deer Lodge.

Powell County voters have supported Republican Party candidates in every national election since 1964.

Communities

City
 Deer Lodge (county seat)

Census-designated places

 Avon
 Elliston
 Garrison
 Goldcreek
 Helmville
 Ovando
 Racetrack

Other unincorporated communities

 Carpenter's Bar
 Danielsville
 Jens
 Pioneer
 Wall City

See also
 List of lakes in Powell County, Montana
 List of mountains in Powell County, Montana
 National Register of Historic Places listings in Powell County, Montana

References

External links
 Grant-Kohrs Ranch National Historic Site
 Montana State Prison
 Clark Fork Watershed Education Program
 Old Montana Prison Museums
 Powell County Chamber of Commerce
 Powell County Website

 
1901 establishments in Montana
Populated places established in 1901